River Valley Conference can refer to several American high school athletics leagues:
 River Valley Conference (Illinois)
 River Valley Conference (Iowa)
 River Valley Conference (Michigan)